The Massachusetts Department of Correction is responsible for operating the prison system of the Commonwealth of Massachusetts in the United States. The Massachusetts Department of Correction is responsible for the custody of about 8,292 prisoners (as of January 2020) throughout 16 correctional facilities  and is the 5th largest state agency in the state of Massachusetts, employing over 4,800 people (about 3,200 of whom are sworn correctional officers).  The Massachusetts Department of Correction also has a fugitive apprehension unit, a gang intelligence unit, a K9 Unit, a Special Reaction Team (SRT), and a Tactical Response Team (TRT).  Both of these tactical units are highly trained and are paramilitary in nature. The agency is headquartered in Milford, Massachusetts and currently headed by Commissioner Carol Mici.

Mission statement
The Massachusetts Department of Correction's mission is to promote public safety by incarcerating offenders while providing opportunities for participation in effective programming designed to reduce recidivism.

Officer Rank Structure
Only the ranks of Captain and below wear uniforms, the ranks and insignia are as shown below.

Correctional Facilities

''See List of Massachusetts state correctional facilities

Security Levels
The following security levels are utilized by the Massachusetts Department of Correction.
Maximum Facility: Souza-Baranowski Correctional Center, Massachusetts Correctional Institution - Cedar Junction.
Medium Facilities: Old Colony Correctional Center, Bridgewater State Hospital, Massachusetts Correctional Institution - Concord, Massachusetts Treatment Center, Massachusetts Correctional Institution - Norfolk, North Central Correctional Institution, Lemuel Shattuck Hospital Correctional Unit, Massachusetts Correctional Institution - Framingham, and Massachusetts Correctional Institution - Shirley.
Minimum Facilities: Massachusetts Alcohol, Substance Abuse Center at Plymouth - Plymouth,  Boston Pre-Release Center, Northeastern Correctional Center, Pondville Correctional Center, South Middlesex Correctional Center.
Pre-Release Facilities: Boston Pre-Release Center, Northeastern Correctional Center, Pondville Correctional Center, South Middlesex Correctional Center.

Prison overcrowding rates
The total operational occupancy for DOC facilities as of January 6, 2020 was 72%. Operational capacity, according to the Association of State Correctional Administrators (ASCA), is the number of beds authorized for safe and efficient operation of the facility. It does not include beds reserved for discipline, investigations, infirmary or other temporary holds for special purposes. The total design occupancy for DOC facilities as of 1st quarter 2020 was 101%. Design capacity is the number of inmates that planners or architects intended for the institution [as defined by the U.S. Department of Justice, Bureau of Justice Statistics (BJS)]. Rated capacity is the number of beds or inmates assigned by a rating official to institutions within the jurisdiction, essentially formally updated from the original design capacity.

Prison COVID-19 Testing and Cases
Pursuant to the Supreme Judicial Court's April 3, 2020 Opinion and Order in the Committee for Public Counsel Services v. Chief Justice of the Trial Court, SJC-12926 matter, as amended on April 10, April 28 and June 23, 2020 (the “Order”), the Special Master posts weekly reports which are located on the SJC website here  for COVID testing and cases for each of the correctional facilities administered by the Department of Correction and each of the county Sheriffs’ offices. The SJC Special master link above has the most up to date information reported by the correctional agencies and is posted for the public to view.

Prisoner Demographics 
MA DOC Jurisdiction Population by Race/Ethnicity on January 1, 2020.

 White (3,502) - 42%
 Black (2,326) - 28%
Hispanic (2,192) - 26%
Asian (120) - 1%
Native American/Alaskan (48) - 1%
Pacific Islander (1) - 1%
Other (103) - 1.0%

MA DOC Jurisdiction Population by Gender on January 1, 2020.
Male (7,988) - 96% 
Female (304) - 4%

Correction Officer Training Academy
The Department of Correction's training is conducted at the Department Headquarters located in Milford, MA.  The academy consists of 10–12 weeks of paramilitary type training for new correction officer recruits.  (The academy also trains Correctional Program Officers (CPO), Industrial Instructors, Recreation Officers, Correctional Cooks).  Recruits are taught the policies and procedures of the department, self-defense, firearms use, proper handcuffing and restraint techniques, proper emergency vehicle operations, suicide prevention, security operations, and many other topics.  Once a recruit completes the academy he or she is sworn in as a Massachusetts State Correction Officer and is assigned to one of the state's sixteen correctional facilities to be further trained by a Field Training Officer (FTO).  The field training program is similar to the type of training police departments use to train new police officers.

Fallen Officers
Since the establishment of the Massachusetts Department of Correction, 14 officers have died in the line of duty.  The most recent line of duty death was in 1998 at MCI-Shirley.

Inmate Suicide

The suicide rates among people locked up in Massachusetts has been among the highest in the nation. A 2020 report from the US Department of Justice concluded there is "reasonable cause to believe that MDOC has engaged in a pattern or practice of resistance to rights protected by the Eighth Amendment because it fails to provide constitutionally adequate supervision and mental health care to prisoners in mental health crisis and places them in mental health watch for prolonged periods of time under restrictive housing conditions that violate their constitutional rights."

Headquarters
The Massachusetts Department of Correction's headquarters is located in Milford, Massachusetts.

50 Maple Street, Suite 3

Milford, MA 01757

(508) 422-3300

See also

List of law enforcement agencies in Massachusetts
List of United States state correction agencies
Massachusetts Department of Youth Services
Concord Prison Outreach (Private not-for-profit organization)
Prison–industrial complex
Incarceration in the United States
Prison abolition movement

References

External links
Official website

State corrections departments of the United States
State law enforcement agencies of Massachusetts
1919 establishments in Massachusetts